New Zealand Wide Pro Wrestling (NZWPW) is a professional wrestling promotion based in Petone and later Wainuiomata in New Zealand. The promotion entered a hiatus in 2018, when former NZWPW wrestler, Jay Marshall left the promotion to start Capital Pro Wrestling. Since 2020, professional wrestling and training in Wainuiomata is now run by former NZWPW wrestler, Hayden Thiele with his Valiant Pro promotion. This promotion has many former wrestlers from NZWPW such as Axl Stirling, "Rufguts" Roddy Gunn, Chad Howard and Jade Priest.

History

Formation

NZWPW was formed in October 2003 by martial arts trainer, former New Zealand Sumo Wrestling champion and head of Petone's He Toa Sports Association, Martin Stirling. Stirling noticed a new generation of wrestling fans, brought up on WWF action. With a wrestling ring already set up at his He Toa gym, Stirling sent an invitation for prospective Wrestlers. Four men answered the call, X-Rated, Juice, Inferno and D-Hoya, with these four pioneers, NZWPW was born. Wrestlers trained by Stirling first performed at the Armageddon Convention on 20 September 2003, as part of an Impact Pro Wrestling show, and the promotion was launched under the name Wellington Pro Wrestling (WPW). WPW's first show was held on 14 November 2003 in Petone. Throughout 2004, more wrestlers joined and small shows were held at community venues around the Hutt Valley. Soon, Stirling, was inundated with prospective wrestlers and had to hold training weekends to find the best talent.

WPW then got re-branded to New Zealand Wide Pro Wrestling in January 2005. This was partly because the domain name for WPW was already used and to reflect the growing interest in touring New Zealand (Christchurch, Masterton, Levin, Gisborne, Hastings and Auckland) as well as the Wellington area. By May 2005, NZWPW had a presence on the internet and thirty five active wrestlers. On 25 March 2005 NZWPW held the Powerplay 2 event at the Lower Hutt Town Hall with over 300 fans in attendance

Expansion
NZWPW performed shows in Christchurch, Palmerston North, Porirua, Otaki, Levin, Paraparaumu, Blenheim and many others major centres up and down the country making it the most widely touring New Zealand promotion and the only one to perform regularly in both New Zealand's North Island and South Island. Wrestlers from NZWPW have also wrestled for Australian promotion Impact Pro Wrestling Australia (formerly Major Impact Wrestling). Female wrestler Misty also competed in the all women's Australian promotion PWWA.

In May 2006 a number of NZWPW wrestlers, led by former NZWPW booker The Punisher and WCW/NWA star Rip Morgan, left to set up a rival promotion called Kiwi Pro Wrestling. Since then NZWPW has had an on-again-off-again working relationship with Auckland-based promotion Impact Pro Wrestling. In 2008 NZWPW featured on the television show 'Good Morning' which is a nationally seen show on TV One to promote Powerplay V with all profits being donated to the Te Omanga Hospice. It continued on its charity work in 2009 when it ran a show to raise funds for the Movember foundation. NZWPW also co-promoted a show with the Australasian Wrestling Federation featuring Raven. In 2009 Chris Masters featured at Powerplay VI, making numerous television appearances to promote the event including 'Good Morning' and '20/20'.

Martial arts
Thanks to Martin Stirling's martial arts background, NZWPW made much of its links with New Zealand's martial arts scene. Many of their early shows featured demonstrations of fighting styles such as karate and kickboxing. Shows have also been co-promoted with major Sumo events such as the 2005 Oceania Sumo Championships and the 2006 New Zealand Open Sumo Championships.

Also in 2006, NZWPW co-sponsored sumo wrestlers Sio Sakaria and Mark Tanu to attend the Junior World Championships in Estonia, where they won silver and bronze medals respectively.

In 2009 NZWPW wrestlers Travis Banks and Tykade both won gold medals at the Oceania Sumo championships in Australia.

This was backed up in 2010 when numerous NZWPW wrestlers took part in the Oceania Sumo Championships (this time held in Lower Hutt, Wellington, New Zealand). With Tykade once again taking out the open and heavyweight divisions, Rufguts and Ben Mana were also in the medals in the heavyweight and open divisions.

Travis Banks, Tykade and Rufguts went on to compete at the World Combat Games in China in August 2010.

Triangle TV

Invasion
New Zealand Wide Pro Wrestling Invasion previously aired on Triangle TV & Stratos. The show debuted on 21 August 2008 at 11pm. Invasion includes touring of NZWPW and was officially kicked off on 16 August in Wainuiomata and occasionally, Upper Hutt. The show ended prior to the New Year of 2009.

Championships

Current Champions

NZWPW Heavyweight Championship

The NZWPW Heavyweight Championship was the top professional wrestling championship title in the New Zealand promotion New Zealand Wide Pro Wrestling (NZWPW). It was the original super heavyweight title of Wellington Pro Wrestling and introduced as the WPW Super Heavyweight Championship on 3 December 2004. The inaugural champion was Ruamoko, who defeated Les Barrett in a tournament final in Lower Hutt, New Zealand on 25 April 1992. The title became vacant when Ruamoko suffered an injury in early-2005 and, after the promotion became New Zealand Wide Pro Wrestling, it was replaced by the current heavyweight championship first won by Island Boy Si on 25 March 2005.

NZWPW Tag Team Championship

The NZWPW Tag Team Championship was the top professional wrestling tag team championship title in the New Zealand promotion New Zealand Wide Pro Wrestling. The title was first won by The Superlatives (Jean Miracle and Nick Silver), who won a tournament final at Power Play IV in Lower Hutt, New Zealand to win the titles on 14 April 2007. It was the first title of its kind to be established by a major promotion since the NWA Australasian Tag Team Championship during the early 1980s and was the oldest active tag team championship in New Zealand.

He Toa Cup

The He Toa Cup was the secondary singles professional wrestling championship in the New Zealand promotion New Zealand Wide Pro Wrestling. The cup was first won by Ben Mana on 10 December 2011 in Petone, New Zealand. From 2011 – 2013, the cup was defended at every NZWPW show held in the He Toa Gym in Petone. The final champion was "The Spartan" Sam Black, who was in his first reign.

Title history

List of combined reigns

Alumni

 Adam Avalanche
 Axl
 Amy St. Clere
 Ben Mana
 Bryant
 CD
 Chad Howard
 Chrome
 Corey Dallas
 Creed
 D-Hoya
 Dan Stirling
 Fred The Great
 GI Jay
 Gold
 H-Flame
 Harry Peters
 Hayden Thiele
 Inferno
 Island Boy Si
 Ivan Dragunov
 Jakob Cross
 Jade Priest
 James Shaw
 Jay Marshall
 JC Star
 Jean Miracle
 Jimmy Sparx
 Johnny Idol
 Jonnie Juice
 Les Barrett
 Lolly Lane
 Matt Ryder
 MacBeth
 Matariki
 Max Damage

 Mikey Rave
 Misty
 Mr Silver
 NOS
 Osiris
 Paul Sayers
 Roddy Gunn
 Ruamoko
 Sandstorm
 Scarlett
 Scravenge
 Silky Love
 Skull Kid
 Sonya Meyers
 Stellar Hammer
 Tank
 The Nerd
 The Punisher 
 The Ram
 Shane Sinclair
 Thor
 Travis Banks
 Tykade
 Umlaut
 X-Rated

Non-Wrestling Personnel
 Chris Ferguson (Referee)
 Damian Skyfire (Referee)
 Danny Sol (Referee)
 Martin Stirling (Owner)
 Phil Woodgate (Chief Wrestling Officer)
 Rehua (Commentator)
 Roneel Kumar (Commentator)

Powerplay history
Powerplay was NZWPW's biggest and longest running event. A Powerplay event had been held almost every year of the promotion's existence.

Powerplay (2004)

Powerplay II

Powerplay III

Powerplay 6

Powerplay VII

Powerplay XI

5 on 5 Elimination Tag Team mtch

Powerplay 2017

See also

Professional wrestling in New Zealand
List of professional wrestling promotions in New Zealand

References

External links 
 

New Zealand professional wrestling promotions
Entertainment companies established in 2003
Sport in Wellington
Companies based in Wellington